Zacharoula "Chara" Karyami (born 7 April 1983 in Athens) is a Greek rhythmic gymnast. She won a bronze medal at the 2000 Summer Olympics.

References 

Sports Reference

Living people
1983 births
Gymnasts from Athens
Greek rhythmic gymnasts
Olympic gymnasts of Greece
Olympic bronze medalists for Greece
Gymnasts at the 2000 Summer Olympics
Olympic medalists in gymnastics

Medalists at the 2000 Summer Olympics
21st-century Greek women